Eastern News Agency commonly refers to:
 Eastern News Agency, Singapore
 Eastern News Agency (Bangladesh)